Archibald Hilson Ross (1821–1900) was a 19th-century Member of Parliament from the Otago region of New Zealand, and Mayor of Dunedin.

He was Mayor of Dunedin from 1880 to 1881.

Ross came second in the 1878 Roslyn by-election, beaten by Henry Driver. He was defeated in the 1890 general election for the new electorate of Dunedin Suburbs.

References

1821 births
1900 deaths
Members of the New Zealand House of Representatives
Mayors of Dunedin
New Zealand MPs for Dunedin electorates
Unsuccessful candidates in the 1890 New Zealand general election
19th-century New Zealand politicians